, also known as Kōenjihyakkei, is a Japanese Zeuhl band led by Tatsuya Yoshida (from the Japanese band Ruins), and is "his tribute to the 'Zeuhl' music" of French prog-rock band Magma.

The band released their first (self-titled) album in 1994 with Aki Kubota from Bondage Fruit on vocals and keyboard. Though rhythmically not as complex as Ruins, Kōenji Hyakkei still evokes a feeling of unfamiliarity due to non-standard modes and chanting in a nonsensical language.

History 
According to the official website of the band,  maintained by Tatsuya Yoshida, the band was formed in 1991 with Tatsuya Yoshida (drums), Aki Kubota (vocals), Akio Izumi (guitar, ex-Aburadako), Chie Kitahara (keyboards, ex-Phaidia) and Kazuyoshi Kimoto (bass, ex-Ruins). The name Koenji Hyakkei derives from a district where the members lived in Tokyo (Koenji, Suginami-ku, Tokyo) except Kazuyoshi Kimoto. Also as the album cover art of the first album indicates, Hyakkei was borrowed from "Fugaku Hyakkei" (One Hundred Views of Mount Fuji) by novelist Osamu Dazai crossed with well-known series of Hokusai's ukiyoe wood prints, "Fugaku Sanjurokkei" (Thirty-Six Views of Mt Fuji). The album cover is a rendition of "Totomi sanchu" from the series.

Kōenji Hyakkei's first album in 13 years, Dhorimviskha, was released on June 27, 2018.

Band members 
Yoshida has been the only consistent member of the band, with Sakamoto Kengo playing bass from their second album onward. As the band has added new members, the band's sound changes, shifting from folk-influenced progressive rock to minimalism to jazz fusion with the inclusion of Komori Keiko on reeds (usually soprano saxophone) on their album Angherr Shisspa (2005).

Language 
It is not clear what language is used for Kōenji Hyakkei lyrics. For the most part, lyrics are reminiscent of Christian Vander's Kobaïan language (a notable exception is the song "Zoltan" from their 1994 self-titled album Hundred Sights of Koenji, a Kyrie). There are few words shorter than four letters, and almost no instances of words repeated in more than one phrase. In addition, spelling conventions and pronunciation vary between albums and songs.

There is no standard way of romanizing the name 高円寺百景. Official sources write it as Koenji Hyakkei or Koenjihyakkei and less commonly KoenjiHyakkei, Koenji-Hyakkei, and others.

Discography 
 1994: Hundred Sights of Koenji (高円寺百景) (remastered and reissued in 2008)
 1997: Viva Koenji! (弐(II))
 2001: Nivraym (remastered and reissued in 2009)
 2005: Angherr Shisspa
 2018: Dhorimviskha

Videography 
 2002: Live at Star Pine's Cafe (DVD)
 2006: Live at Doors (DVD)
 2008: 070531 (DVD)
 2010: Live at Koenji High (DVD)

References

External links 
 
 Kōenjihyakkei discography, album releases & credits at Discogs.com
 Koenjihyakkei albums to be listened as stream at Spotify.com
 Kōenji Hyakkei @ Skin Graft Records

Musical groups from Tokyo
Japanese progressive rock groups
Zeuhl